June Lee is an adjunct professor in the UCSF School of Medicine, biotech executive, and medical doctor with expertise in pulmonary, critical care medicine and translational research.

Background 
June Lee was born in Seoul, South Korea, and immigrated to United States at age 10.  June, her two brothers, and her parents settled in southern California.

She graduated from John F. Kennedy High School in Granada Hills.  She developed interest in medicine and science early in part due to a familial hereditary condition. She received her undergraduate degree in chemistry at Johns Hopkins University in 1988, and earned her medical degree at the University of California, Davis in 1992. She performed residency in internal medicine at UCLA and fellowship in pulmonary and critical medicine at UCSF.

Career

Hospital work
Lee served as the medical director of the High-Risk Asthma Clinic at San Francisco General Hospital. She maintained an independent research program prior to Genentech, funded by the American Lung Association, to investigate IL-13 induced transcription, among other pulmonary treatments.

Genentech
Lee joined the clinical development organization at Genentech initially to help launch a new biologic treatment for asthma (the data from a large respiratory study – TENOR – that resulted in multiple insights into risk factors and demographics for asthma sufferers).

UCSF
Lee holds a professorship at UCSF in the School of Medicine. She was the director of Early Translational Research at UCSF. From 2011 to 2017, Lee served as the director of the Catalyst Program inside UCSF, which served as an internal incubator for entrepreneurial ideas from faculty, in addition to providing de-risking outsourcing partnerships and educational modules for graduate students.

MyoKardia
Lee served as the chief operating officer and chief development officer for MyoKardia.  Myokardia was acquired by Bristol Myers Squibb for $13.1 billion in November 2020.

Esker Therapeutics
June was the President and Founding CEO of Esker Therapeutics.

Other
She is a member of the board of directors for Novus Therapeutics, GenEdit and serves on the scientific advisory board for Foresite Labs and Aer Therapeutics.  She also serves on the advisory board for the Johns Hopkins University Center for Therapeutic Translation.

Public service 
Lee has been a volunteer member of the Council of Korean Americans since 2013, and currently sits on its board of directors and previously served as chair of the board. She has served previously as chair of the Drug, Device, Discovery, and Development Workgroup of UC BRAID (University of California Biomedical Research Acceleration Integration and Development).

Lee is a fellow of the American College of Chest Physicians.

References 

Date of birth missing (living people)
Living people
Year of birth missing (living people)
Place of birth missing (living people)
Johns Hopkins University alumni
University of California, Davis alumni
American internists
American women physicians
American pulmonologists
American medical researchers
UCSF School of Medicine faculty
American chief operating officers
American physicians of Korean descent
South Korean emigrants to the United States
American women academics
21st-century American women physicians
21st-century American physicians
Women internists